Gloria Mildred DeHaven (July 23, 1925 – July 30, 2016) was an American actress and singer who was a contract star for Metro-Goldwyn-Mayer (MGM).

Early life
DeHaven was born in Los Angeles, California, the daughter of actor-director Carter DeHaven and actress Flora Parker DeHaven, both former vaudeville performers.  A 1983 newspaper article reported, "Miss DeHaven ... says that her real family name was O'Callahan before her father legally changed his name to DeHaven."

Film
She began her career as a child actor with a bit part in Charlie Chaplin's Modern Times (1936). She was signed to a contract with MGM. She had featured roles in such films as Best Foot Forward (1943), The Thin Man Goes Home (1944), Scene of the Crime (1949) and Summer Stock (1950), and was voted by exhibitors as the third most likely to be a "star of tomorrow'" in 1944. She portrayed her own mother, Flora Parker DeHaven, in the Fred Astaire film Three Little Words (1950).

After a long absence from the screen, DeHaven appeared as the love interest of Jack Lemmon in the comedy Out to Sea (1997), also starring Walter Matthau.

Music
DeHaven's musical talents supplemented her acting abilities. Besides being cast as a singer in many of her films, including I'll Get By, So This Is Paris and The Girl Rush, and performing numbers in many of her movies, DeHaven sang with the bands of Jan Savitt and Bob Crosby and at one time had her own nightclub act. DeHaven appeared often in the 1950's at the El Rancho Vegas, the first full service hotel casino on the Las Vegas Strip During the early 1960s, DeHaven recorded for the small Seeco label, where she appeared on the 1962 compilation album Gloria Lynne and Her Friends. She was also heard on four of the Revisited compilations produced by Ben Bagley.

Television
DeHaven appeared in the soap operas Ryan's Hope (as Bess Shelby), As the World Turns (as Sara Fuller), and Mary Hartman, Mary Hartman. She was one of the numerous celebrities who appeared in the all-star box office flop, Won Ton Ton, the Dog Who Saved Hollywood (1976), and guest-starred in television series, including Robert Montgomery Presents; Appointment with Adventure (episode entitled "The Snow People"); The Guy Mitchell Show; Johnny Ringo (as Rosemary Blake in "Love Affair"); The Rifleman; Wagon Train; The Lloyd Bridges Show; Flipper; Marcus Welby, M.D.; Gunsmoke; Mannix; The Jimmy Stewart Show, The Eddie Capra Mysteries; Fantasy Island; Hart to Hart; The Love Boat; Mama's Family; Highway to Heaven; Murder, She Wrote; and Touched by an Angel. On March 21, 1974, Gloria appeared as a guest on The Tonight Show Starring Johnny Carson. Later that year, she was cast in the short-lived police drama Nakia., She also appeared with Horace Heidt on his "Swift Family Show Wagon" in 1955.

From January 1969 to February 1971, DeHaven hosted a morning call-in movie show on WABC-TV in New York City.  She also appeared on five episodes of Match Game 75 as a guest panelist.

Stage
DeHaven's Broadway debut came in 1955. She played Diane in the musical version of Seventh Heaven. She also toured in a summer stock production of No, No, Nanette.

Personal life

DeHaven married four times. Her first husband was actor John Payne, star of The Restless Gun, whom she married in 1944 and divorced in 1950.  Her second husband was real estate developer Martin Kimmel.  They were married in 1953 and divorced the following year. She was married to Richard Fincher, son of a Miami Oldsmobile dealer, from 1957 until 1963. They remarried in 1965 and divorced again in 1969.

She had two children with Payne, daughter Kathleen Hope (born 1945) and son Thomas John (born 1947) as well as two children with Fincher, son Harry (born 1958) and daughter Faith (born 1962).

DeHaven has a star on the Hollywood Walk of Fame at 6933 Hollywood Blvd.

DeHaven was a staunch Republican and attributed her youthful appearance in later years to an organic diet and faith in prayer.

Death
DeHaven died on July 30, 2016, in Las Vegas of undisclosed causes a week after her 91st birthday while in hospice care after having had a stroke a few months earlier. She was survived by her four children.

Filmography

Films

Television

Stage work
Seventh Heaven (1955)
The Unsinkable Molly Brown (1963)
The Sound of Music (1964)
Golden Boy (1968)
Plaza Suite (1971)
Hello, Dolly (1973)
No, No, Nanette (1983)
A High-Time Salute to Martin and Blane (1991) (benefit concert)

Radio appearances
{| class="wikitable"
|-
! Year !! Program !! Episode/source
|-
| 1952|| Broadway Playhouse || Practically Yours
|-
| 1953|| Theatre Guild on the Air || O'Halloran's Luck''''
|}

References

Further reading
 Oderman, Stuart, Talking to the Piano Player 2. BearManor Media, 2009. .
 Dye, David. Child and Youth Actors: Filmography of Their Entire Careers, 1914–1985''. Jefferson, NC: McFarland & Co., 1988, p. 54.

External links

 
 
 
 
 
 Gloria DeHaven(Aveleyman)

1925 births
2016 deaths
American film actresses
American soap opera actresses
American television actresses
Actresses from Los Angeles
California Republicans
Nevada Republicans
Metro-Goldwyn-Mayer contract players
20th-century American actresses
American stage actresses
American musical theatre actresses
21st-century American women